Gerhard Schmidt (11 May 1924 - 3 April 2010) was professor of the history of art at the University of Vienna. He was Slade Professor of Fine Art at the University of Cambridge 1981–82.

Schmidt was the son of a physician. After work and military service as well as American war imprisonment, he began studying medicine at the University of Vienna in 1946. In 1947 he moved to the fields of archeology and art history. In 1951 he graduated with a dissertation on French relief sculpture.

He habilitated in 1959 with the work "Die Armenbibeln des XIV. Jahrhunderts". In 1968, he was appointed full professor of the University of Vienna from which he retired in 1992. From 1973 he was a member of the philosophical-historical class of the Austrian Academy of Sciences and was elected a full member in 1984.

Schmidt was buried at the Heiligenstadt cemetery in Vienna.

Selected publications
 Neue Malerei in Osterreich. 1956
 Die Armenbibeln des XIV. Jahrhunderts. 1959
 Die Wiener Biblia pauperum. 1962
 Die Malerschule von St. Florian. 1962
 Krumauer Bildercodex. 1967
 Stelzen und Pylonen. 1989
 Gotische Bildwerke und ihre Meister. 1991

References

External links
Books by Gerhard Schmidt at the Deutsche Nationalbibliothek.

Austrian art historians
1924 births
Academic staff of the University of Vienna
Academics of the University of Cambridge
University of Vienna alumni
2010 deaths
Fellows of the Australian Academy of Science